Lyambir is an air base in Russia, located  north of Saransk.  It is a large airfield with parallel taxiway and tarmac space.  Probably a forward deployment airfield.  Google Earth images show airfield empty except for a few small single-engine propeller planes.

References
RussianAirFields.com

Soviet Air Force bases